Florian Enache (born 9 April 1971) is a Romanian bobsledder. He competed at the 1994, 1998 and the 2002 Winter Olympics.

References

1971 births
Living people
Romanian male bobsledders
Olympic bobsledders of Romania
Bobsledders at the 1994 Winter Olympics
Bobsledders at the 1998 Winter Olympics
Bobsledders at the 2002 Winter Olympics
People from Breaza